Epiblema strenuana, the stem-galling moth or ragweed borer, is a moth of the family Tortricidae. It is endemic to North America, but was introduced to Australia from Mexico to control the weeds of the family Asteraceae (Xanthium occidentale, Ambrosia artemisiifolia and Parthenium hysterophorus) in 1982. It is occasionally misspelled as Epiblema strenuanum.

The wingspan is about 15 mm.

The larvae mainly feed on Asteraceae species, including Ambrosia and Xanthium. It has also been recorded on Chenopodium species. The first instar larva burrows into the leaf to feed. Later, it burrows into the centre of a growing shoot, feeding on the terminal meristem. It induces the plant to thicken the stem, creating an elongated gall. In this gall, the caterpillar subsequently lives, feeds and pupates.

References

External links
 Australian Lepidoptera
 Parthenium Biological Control Agents

Olethreutinae
Lepidoptera used as pest control agents
Moths described in 1863